Yu Yuanyuan (born 30 January 1995) is a Chinese handball player for Jiangsu and the Chinese national team.

She represented China at the 2013 World Women's Handball Championship in Serbia, where the Chinese team placed 18th.

References

Chinese female handball players
1995 births
Living people
Handball players at the 2018 Asian Games
Asian Games silver medalists for China
Asian Games medalists in handball
Medalists at the 2018 Asian Games